Bayer may refer to:
 a native or inhabitant of the Free State of Bavaria (Freistaat Bayern)
 Bayer AG, a German chemical and pharmaceutical company
 Bayer (crater), a lunar crater
 Bayer filter, a color filter mosaic also known as a Bayer pattern or Bayer mask, used in digital camera image sensors
 Bayer designation for star names
 KFC Uerdingen 05, formerly known as FC Bayer 05 Uerdingen, a German football club
 Bayer Leverkusen, a German sports and football club
 Bayer Esporte Clube, a Brazilian football club
 Baeyer's reagent, a mild oxidation reagent used in organic chemistry
 Bayer (surname), list of people with this name

See also
Beyer, a surname
Buyer